I Aim at the Stars is a 1960 biographical film which tells the story of the life of Wernher von Braun. The film covers his life from his early days in Germany, through Peenemünde, until his work with the U.S. Army, NASA, and the American space program.

The film stars Curt Jürgens, Victoria Shaw, Herbert Lom, Gia Scala, and James Daly.

The film was written by Jay Dratler based on a story by George Froeschel, H. W. John, and Udo Wolter. It was directed by J. Lee Thompson.

It was shot at the Bavaria Studios in Munich, with sets designed by the art director Hans Berthel.

The film was premiered in Munich on 19 August 1960; it subsequently opened in New York City and Los Angeles on 19 October and London on 24 November. In Germany the film was titled Ich greife nach den Sternen ("I Reach for the Stars"). In Italy the film was released as Alla Conquista dell' Infinito.

Satirist Mort Sahl and others are often credited with suggesting the subtitle "(But Sometimes I Hit London)", but in fact the line appears in the film itself, spoken by actor James Daly, who plays the cynical American press officer.

Dell published a comic book adaptation of the film with art by Jack Sparling as Four Color #1148 (October 1960).

Plot

Cast
 Curd Jürgens as Wernher von Braun 
 Victoria Shaw as Maria von Braun 
 Herbert Lom as Anton Reger 
 Gia Scala as Elizabeth Beyer 
 James Daly as U.S. Major William Taggert 
 Adrian Hoven as Mischke 
 Gerard Heinz as Professor Oberth 
 Karel Stepanek as Captain Dornberger 
 Peter Capell as Dr. Neumann 
 Hayden Rorke as U.S. Army Major 
 Austin Willis as U.S. General John B. Medaris 
 Alan Gifford as U.S. Army Colonel 
 Helmo Kindermann as General Kulp 
 Lea Seidl as Baroness von Braun 
 John Crawford as Dr. Bosco - White Sands, New Mexico

Production
Filming started in Munich in October 1959. Thompson said shortly before filming that "Many Britons feel Von Braun should have stood trial as a war criminal and no sooner did I sign to direct the biopic when a sizable section of the press advised, 'This motion picture should not be made. He added that "The U-S ... didn't hesitate a moment when Von Braun surrendered. They put him to work. Can rejection of a great brain be justified? Current examples of this dilemma are not wanting. And though I oppose rejection, in 'Stars' we will let the public decide for itself."

The film's release was delayed in Britain due to controversy over what was considered an overly-sympathetic depiction of Von Braun. Thompson argued the film "doesn't whitewash Van Braun" saying "we set out to present an honest study of a man's mind and life and that's what we have done. He's neither a hero nor a villain, neither all black or all white. He's simply a man of our times. To me the real villains are power politicians." Thompson said von Braun "wasn't entirely pleased" about the movie and did not know why the scientist let them make the movie. Thompson said he and von Braun "disliked each other on sight. And though I came to admire certain qualities in him – his dedication, for example – I can't help wondering what some of these scientists have in place of a heart."

See also
 List of American films of 1960

References

External links
 
 

1960 films
1960s biographical drama films
American biographical drama films
American black-and-white films
Columbia Pictures films
1960s English-language films
Films about Nazi Germany
Films about space programs
Films adapted into comics
Films directed by J. Lee Thompson
Films scored by Laurie Johnson
Films set in the 1920s
Films set in the 1930s
Films set in the 1940s
Films set in 1945
Films set in the 1950s
Films set in 1957
Films set in 1958
Films set in Berlin
Films set in Germany
Films set in New Mexico
Films shot in Germany
Cultural depictions of Wernher von Braun
Films shot at Bavaria Studios
1960 drama films
Films produced by Charles H. Schneer
1960s American films